Paula Badosa was the defending champion, but was no longer eligible to participate.

Rebeka Masarova won the title, defeating Amanda Anisimova in the final, 7–5, 7–5.

Seeds

Draw

Finals

Top half

Section 1

Section 2

Bottom half

Section 3

Section 4

Qualifying

Seeds

Qualifiers

Draw

First qualifier

Second qualifier

Third qualifier

Fourth qualifier

Fifth qualifier

Sixth qualifier

Seventh qualifier

Eighth qualifier

External links 
 Draw

Girls' Singles
French Open, 2016 Girls' Singles